Mahshid Moshiri, born in Tehran, Iran is an Iranian novelist and lexicographer.

Youth and studies
Mahshid Moshiri was born in Tehran, Iran. She graduated from the University of Sorbonne with a PhD in linguistics.  She is the author of the first Persian Phono-Orthographic Dictionary. She is also an encyclopedist, and has served as the Research Vice President of The Great Persian Encyclopedia Foundation.

Selected works

Persian dictionaries
Persian Dictionary (alphabetical & analogical). 5th ed, Soroush, Tehran, 2004.
An Unabridged Persian Dictionary (Fascicle 1).  GPE, Tehran. 2003.
Persian General Dictionary (in 2 volumes). 2nd ed, Alborz, Tehran, 2004.
Concise Persian Dictionary. 6th ed, Alborz, Tehran, 2003.
Collegiate Persian Dictionary. 2nd ed, Peykan, Tehran, 2003.

Bilingual dictionaries
Dictionary of the Verbs (French-Persian). 2nd ed, Soroush, Tehran, 2004.
Atlas English-Persian Dictionary (5 volumes), Editor-in-Chief, Aryan-Tarjoman, Tehran, 2007.

Specialized dictionaries
Persian Phono-Orthographic Dictionary. Ketabsara, Tehran, 1987.
Dictionary of European Words in Persian. Alborz, Tehran, 1993.
Dictionary of Love & Gnosticism. Alborz, Tehran, 1997.
Dictionary of Reduplication, assimilation & repetition in Persian. Agahan-e Ideh, Tehran, 1999.
Thematic Dictionary of Saadi's Lyrics. Hormozgan University Press, 2000.
Thematic Dictionary of Farrokhi Yazdi’s Lyrics. Agahan-e Ideh, Tehran, 2000.
Rime & Rhythm Dictionary of Saadi's Lyrics. Hormozgan University Press, 2001.
A Persian Dictionary of the Youngsters’ Vernacular. Agahan-e Ideh, Tehran, 2002.
 Dictionary of Persian poets from the apparition of Dari Persian until today (realized in French language. Aryan-Tarjoman. Tehran. 2007.

Novels
Yad-e Jaran (The Memories of Childhood). Alborz, Tehran, 1998.
There is a fire … Hamshahri, Tehran, 2003.
The anemone has flowered everywhere. (Iranian novel in French). Aryan-Tarjoman, Tehran,  2007.

References

Iranian lexicographers
Linguists from Iran
Iranian women novelists
Iranian novelists
Iranian translators
University of Paris alumni
Living people
Iranian women short story writers
People from Kermanshah
1931 births
Translators of Forough Farrokhzad